On January 8–9, 2013 a trial was held by the People's Court of Nghệ An Province, Vietnam for 14 democracy activists, 
primarily belonging to the Catholic church, including high-profile blogger Paulus Le Son. All of them were sentenced to 3–13 years in prison on charges of subversion. Many human rights organizations have called this the "largest case of its kind" in Vietnam, and condemned the sentence. Many organizations, including the US Embassy in Vietnam, have called for an immediate release of the dissidents.

Defendants 
All 14 defendants were arrested in 2011 as part of the 2011 crackdown on Vietnamese youth activists. They were writers and political and social activists, mainly belonging to Redemptorist group in the Roman Catholic Church. They have engaged in community service and fighting against land seizures and corruption. Recently, many activists have been critical of the Vietnamese government, backing other dissidents and bloggers and called for democracy and human rights. Some defendants have participated in peaceful protests in support of other previously-convicted dissidents.

The defendants were:

Nearly all defendants were bloggers or students. Among the 14 defendants, three of them come from the same family (Dang Ngoc Minh, her son Nguyen Dang Vinh Phuc and her daughter Nguyen Dang Minh Man.

2011 Arrests 

Many of them were arrested in the 2011 by the Vietnamese government for protesting for land rights and circulating a petition to free prominent legal rights activist Cu Huy Ha Vu, a prominent human rights defender who was imprisoned for seven years in April 2011.

Prior the trial Đặng Xuân Diệu, was quoted saying, "I have done nothing contrary to my conscience" and that in punishing him, the government was "trampling on the eternal good morals of the Vietnamese nation."

Trial 
The trial was held in the city of Vinh on January 8 and 9, 2013, by the People's Court of Nghệ An province, Vietnam. The courtroom was packed due to the unusually large number of defendants on trial as well as police.

Outside the courtroom, relatives and supporters of the defendants clashed with hundreds of uniformed as well as plainclothes security police blocking them from gathering outside the court. The police physically attacked many supporters including elderly women and Catholic clergy and some were also temporarily detained. Nguyen Dinh Cuong's mother attempting to attend the trial had also been beaten by police outside the building in the afternoon.

Charges 
The defendants were accused of maintaining ties with Viet Tan
, a US-based pro-democracy organization to establish democracy and reform Vietnam through peaceful and political means. All of the 14 defendants rejected the charges. Defendant Nguyen Dinh Cuong's sister-in-law Kim Chi stated that many defendants have attended training workshops organized by Viet Tan on leadership skills and online security, but that their activism was aimed at helping the people, not at overthrowing the government.

Dang Ngoc Minh and her daughter Nguyen Dang Minh Man were accused of painting the slogan "HS.TS.VN" on a school, which means "Hoang Sa, Truong Sa, Viet Nam". The slogan has been used to support the case in the Paracel Islands and Spratly Islands disputes that the islands belong to Vietnam. The Vietnamese government actually agrees with statement.

Sentence 
The verdict was announced by Judge Tran Ngoc on January 9, 2013. Three have been sentenced to 13 years, and 11 others to 3–8 years on charges violating Clause 1 of Article 79 of the Vietnamese criminal code for organizing "to attempt to overthrow the government". At the trial, Paulus Le Son was the only one not to have acknowledged any wrongdoings.

According to Human Rights Watch, the supposed charges included attending a training course by Viet Tan in Bangkok, being members of Viet Tan or actively participating with the organization.

A BBC report says that these sentences were among "the harshest given to any political dissident in Vietnam in recent years".

International Response 
The United States Embassy in Hanoi stated that it was "deeply troubled" and called the trial a "part of a disturbing human rights trend in Vietnam."

Brad Adams, Asia director of Human Rights Watch, condemned the arrest and calls for the "convictions to be squashed immediately". He states "The conviction of yet more peaceful activists is another example of a government that is increasingly afraid of the opinions of its own people. Instead of imprisoning critics, the Vietnamese government should be honoring them for their efforts to address the myriad problems facing the country that the government itself has also identified." Phil Robertson, the deputy director of the Asia division of Human Rights Watch also followed up with "this was the largest group to be brought to trial together in recent times."

Reporters Without Borders quickly emerged and stated that it is "appalled at the groundless verdict handed down yesterday by a court in northern city of Vinh" and that it is the position to prove his innocence. The statement also reads that "We have proof that the Vietnamese authorities use false pretexts to convict bloggers that criticize them." The organization released a picture of Paulus Le Son attending a training course organized by Reporters Without Borders in Bangkok to prove that he was not meeting with Viet Tan as the prosecutors have claimed.

In a news briefing in Geneva on January 11, Rupert Colville, a spokesperson for the Office of the UN High Commissioner for Human Rights of the United Nations expressed alarm over the fact that "the convictions were handed down after only two days of trial [...] and that these latest convictions [...] exemplify the limited space for critical voices in Vietnam."

In a press release by Amnesty International the organization says that "the conviction and heavy sentencing [...] flies in the face of justice and is part of an escalating government crackdown on freedom of expression."

Duy Hoang, spokesman for Viet Tan, calls the trial "a disregard for peaceful political expression and democratic aspirations." The organization has neither confirmed nor denied that the 14 detained activists are among its members.
 In an official statement, Viet Tan rejects "the fabrications peddled by the communist court to rationalize the 'subversion' charges".

A statement by US Congresswoman Loretta Sanchez says "the final product of an unjust criminal justice system in this subversion case was a verdict of 100 years imprisonment forced upon 14 patriots."

Other human rights organizations have called this the "largest subversion to be brought in years" in Vietnam

Call for Release 
Many other organizations have called for an immediate release of the defendants including the Amnesty International, Electronic Frontier Foundation, English Pen, Human Rights Watch

On January 4, 2013, Allen Weiner, the director of the Stanford Program in International and Comparative Law at Stanford Law School, filed an updated to a previous petition submitted to the United Nations Working Group on Arbitrary Detention in Geneva contesting the illegal arrest and detention of the defendants.

See also 
 2011 crackdown on Vietnamese youth activists
 Paulus Le Son
 Dang Xuan Dieu
 Ho Duc Hoa
 Nguyen Dang Minh Man
 Thai Van Dung
 Tran Minh Nhat
 Le Quoc Quan
 Viet Tan
 Ta Phong Tan
 Human rights in Vietnam

External links 
 US House of Representatives resolution addressing the arrests 
 Statement by Viet Tan on the trial
 Statement by the US Embassy in Vietnam on the conviction
 Paulus Le Son Blog

References 

No-U Movement
Political repression in Vietnam
2013 in Vietnam
History of Nghệ An province
Prisoners and detainees of Vietnam
Vietnamese democracy activists
Vietnamese dissidents
Vietnamese prisoners and detainees